Marián Kelemen (born 7 December 1979) is a Slovak professional footballer who plays as a goalkeeper.

Club career
Born in Michalovce, Czechoslovakia, Kelemen played in no fewer than seven clubs as a youth, having started at local MFK Zemplín. He began his professional career with national powerhouse ŠK Slovan Bratislava and, in January 2002, signed with Bursaspor from Turkey.

After returning to his country and Slovan, Kelemen soon joined Latvia's FK Ventspils. In the summer of 2004, he embarked in a Spanish adventure that would last three years, as he represented CD Tenerife and UD Vecindario, both in the Canary Islands and Segunda División.

In 2007, following Vecindario's relegation, Kelemen moved to Aris Thessaloniki FC. In January 2009, not being first-choice for the Greek, he returned to Spain, this time to its La Liga, signing with CD Numancia until the end of the season, which ended in relegation – he conceded five goals in the first half of his sole appearance, at Racing de Santander.

In January 2010, Kelemen signed for Śląsk Wrocław, being a starter for the vast majority of his spell. On 29 May 2011, he helped trounce 5–0 Arka Gdynia at home by scoring his team's last goal through a penalty kick.

References

External links
 
 
 
 
 Fútbol Mercado profile 

1979 births
Living people
People from Michalovce
Sportspeople from the Košice Region
Slovak footballers
Association football goalkeepers
Slovak Super Liga players
ŠK Slovan Bratislava players
MFK Zemplín Michalovce players
Süper Lig players
Bursaspor footballers
FK Ventspils players
La Liga players
Segunda División players
CD Tenerife players
UD Vecindario players
CD Numancia players
Super League Greece players
Aris Thessaloniki F.C. players
Ekstraklasa players
Śląsk Wrocław players
Jagiellonia Białystok players
Czech First League players
1. FK Příbram players
Slovak expatriate footballers
Expatriate footballers in Turkey
Expatriate footballers in Latvia
Expatriate footballers in Spain
Expatriate footballers in Greece
Expatriate footballers in Poland
Expatriate footballers in the Czech Republic
Slovak expatriate sportspeople in Spain
Slovak expatriate sportspeople in Poland